Most surf breaks in the Capes region – from Cape Naturaliste to Cape Leeuwin – within the larger area known as the South West region of Western Australia tend to have the name Margaret River attached, despite the wide geographic range of locations where the breaks are located.

Context
Surfing in this region was well established in the 1970s, with a 1970 government mapping guide to the region identifying surfing locations.

By the 1990s the names of the individual breaks were so well established that online and published guides were able to locate and identify the behaviours of the breaks.

The surfing culture of the region is well embedded in the communities along the coast.

The roads named below run off Caves Road, the main western route between Dunsborough and Augusta. The identification of nearby roads does not guarantee that there is access to any of these locations.

Some systems in describing locations, have Margaret River North - this list divides as below, using Yalingup, and Gracetown, as boundaries of smaller surfing regions.

The Ngari Capes Marine Park has some many of the breaks listed below in the Special Purpose Zone (Surfing) locations in the park.

East of Cape Naturaliste
These breaks are in the south-west corner of Geographe Bay, sheltered by Cape Naturaliste, and are not directly exposed to westerly winds or surges.
 Castle Rock – north of Dunsborough, and south of Eagle Bay
 Rocky Point – north of Eagle Bay, and east of Bunker Bay
 The Farm and Bone Yards – east of Bunker Bay
 The Quarries – north-west corner of Bunker Bay

South of Cape Naturaliste and north of Yallingup
These breaks are in an isolated difficult access area of the coast north of Yallingup.

 Windmills – north of Sugarloaf Rock
 Three Bears – midway between Sugarloaf and Yallingup
 Yallingup and Rabbit Hill – just north of Yallingup

South of Yallingup and north of Gracetown
The beaches Three Bears, Yallingup, Smiths Beach and Injidup are all considered "beaches of Yallingup" with related surf breaks of the same names.
These breaks are mostly more accessible, but not all.

 Smiths and Supertubes – at Smiths Beach
 Injidup Point/Carparks and Pea Break – south end of Indijup Beach and just north of Cape Clairault
 Cape Clairault – just south of location with same name
 Wildcat and The Window – west of Quinninup Road
 Moses Rock – at west end of road with same name
 Honeycombs – isolated and south of Moses Rock Road
 Gallows – at end of Cullen Road
 Guillotine – west of Juniper Road
 North Point – at northern side of Cowaramup Bay
 Mousetraps – south of Supertubes

Gracetown and south to the Margaret River mouth

Gracetown is a locality on the coastline on Cowaramup Bay, Margaret River Mouth (south side) is the location of Prevelly

 Cowaramup Bombora ("Cow Bombie")
 South Point and Huzzawouie (Huzzas) – southern side of Cowaramup Bay
 Left Handers – south of Cowaramup Bay
 The Womb
 Ellensbrook - 
 The Box – at Cape Mentelle
 The Rivermouth

Prevelly and south to Redgate
Just south of the Margaret river mouth, Surfers Point is the location of the Margaret River Pro surfing events and the central point by which tourism promotion, and simplified explanations of the surfing region focus upon.

 Surfers Point and Southside
 Bombies and Boatramp
 Grunters
 Gas Bay
 Boodjidup
 Redgate

Redgate and south to Cape Hamelin
Breaks and locations between Redgate and Cape Hamelin are more spread out, and not as easily accessed as some northern breaks.

 Conto's Beach – just north of Cape Freycinet
 Boranup – north of Hamelin Bay
 Deepdene – just south of Cape Hamelin

Notes

References

Further reading
Note: these items occur in multiple editions, the editions here might not reflect either the most recent or most accurate guides to locations or names.
  
 
 
 

Surfing locations in South West Western Australia
Capes region of South West Western Australia